The Federal Executive Boards (FEBs) were created in 1961 to foster communication, coordination and collaboration among Federal agencies outside of Washington, DC. They are under the jurisdiction of the Office of Personnel Management. Currently, approximately 88% of Federal employees are located outside the Washington, DC area. Across the nation, in 28 locations with a high concentration of Federal agencies and Federal employees, FEBs provide a forum for Federal leaders to connect to discuss management challenges and strategies. The FEBs enable collaboration on agency missions and goals, common issues,and special initiatives. FEBs are also a resource for agencies to share best practices among their peers.

History
On 10th November 1961, President John F. Kennedy established the Federal Executive Boards.  Kennedy stated in the Memorandum, "I want coordination of government activities outside of Washington significantly strengthened".

The first 10 Federal Executive Boards (FEB) were established by Presidential Directive in 1961 to "increase the effectiveness and economy of Federal agencies." Currently, 28 FEBs are located nationwide in areas with a significant Federal population. The Boards are composed of local, senior-level Federal agency officials.

Today, the Boards are more relevant than at any other time in history. In continuing times of personnel reductions, budget cutbacks and reorganization, interagency collaboration is critical to achieving results. As the local Federal ambassador, the FEB identifies opportunities for partnerships with intergovernmental and community organizations. Interagency collaboration is no longer just a wise choice; it is the platform for meeting agency mission goals.

The FEBs are models for partnership-based government. The Boards serve as a vital link to intergovernmental coordination identifying common ground and building cooperative relationships. FEBs also have a long history of establishing and maintaining valuable communication links to prepare for and respond to local and national emergencies. While promoting issues related to Administration initiatives, they provide targeted training programs, employee development, shared resources, and local community outreach and participation. The Board's role as a conduit of information and a meeting point for a variety of agencies—each with a different mission—is critical to a more effective government. FEBs promote awareness of the Federal Government's involvement in, and contribution to, communities across the country.

The Office of Personnel Management is responsible for the organization and functions of FEBs (5 CFR Part 960)."

Functions
Federal Executive Boards perform several highly valuable functions:

 They serve as forums for the exchange of information between Washington D.C. and state agencies about programs, management strategies and the challenges we face.
 They serve as points of coordination for federal programs;
 They are a means of communication through which Washington can improve understanding of management concerns and challenges; and
 They provide Federal representation and involvement in their communities.

Mission and Vision
Mission - "Increase the effectiveness of Federal Government by strengthening coordination of government activities.

Vision – "To be catalysts for better government."

Strategic Plan
The Federal Executive Boards will  deliver services under three Strategic Goals:

Emergency preparedness, Employee Safety and Security
Workforce Development and Support
Strategic Partnerships

Locations
Atlanta, Georgia
Baltimore, Maryland
Boston, Massachusetts
Buffalo, New York
Chicago, Illinois
Cincinnati, Ohio
Cleveland, Ohio
Dallas-Ft.Worth, Texas
Denver, Colorado
Detroit, Michigan
Honolulu Pacific, Hawaii
Houston, Texas
Kansas City, Missouri
Los Angeles, California
Minneapolis, Minnesota
Albuquerque, New Mexico
Newark, New Jersey
New Orleans, Louisiana
New York, New York
Oklahoma City, Oklahoma
Portland, Oregon
Philadelphia, Pennsylvania
Pittsburgh, Pennsylvania
South Florida
St. Louis, Missouri
San Antonio, Texas
San Francisco, California
Seattle, Washington

References

External links
 
 Strategic and Operational Plan 2018-2022
Annual Report for Fiscal Year 2007
 GAO Report on FEB

United States Office of Personnel Management
1961 establishments in the United States
Government agencies established in 1961
Presidency of John F. Kennedy